The Roman Catholic Archdiocese of Paraná is a metropolitan diocese. Its suffragan sees include Concordia and Gualeguaychú.

History
On 13 June 1859, Pope Pius IX established the Diocese of Paraná from the Diocese of Buenos Aires.  It lost territory to the Diocese of Santa Fe when it was created in 1897 and the Diocese of Corrientes in 1910.  The Diocese of Paraná was elevated to an archdiocese by Pope Pius XI on 20 April 1934.  It lost territory two more times when the dioceses of Gualeguaychú (1957) and Concordia (1961) were created.

Bishops

Ordinaries
Luis José Gabriel Segura y Cubas (1859–1862)
José María Gelabert y Crespo (1865–1897)
Rudesindo de la Lastra y Gordillo (1898–1908)
Abel Juan Bazán y Bustos (1910–1926)
Julián Pedro Martínez (1927–1934)
Zenobio Lorenzo Guilland (1934–1962)
Adolfo Servando Tortolo (1962–1986)
Estanislao Esteban Karlic (1986–2003); elevated to Cardinal in 2007
Mario Luis Bautista Maulión (2003–2010)
Juan Alberto Puiggari (2010–present)

Coadjutor archbishop
Estanislao Esteban Karlic (1983-1986); future Cardinal

Auxiliary bishops
Nicolás de Carlo (1918-1936), appointed Auxiliary Bishop of Santa Fe
Adolfo Servando Tortolo (1956-1960), appointed Archbishop here
Fortunato Antonio Rossi (1961-1963), appointed Bishop of Venado Tuerto
José María Mestres (1974-1987)
Juan Alberto Puiggari (1998-2003), appointed Archbishop here
César Daniel Fernández (2007-2012), appointed Bishop of Jujuy

Other priest of this diocese who became bishop
Ramón Alfredo Dus, appointed Auxiliary Bishop of Reconquista in 2005

Territorial losses

External links and references

Roman Catholic dioceses in Argentina
Roman Catholic Ecclesiastical Province of Paraná
Religious organizations established in 1859
Roman Catholic dioceses and prelatures established in the 19th century
1859 establishments in Argentina